Botryococcus braunii is a green, pyramid-shaped planktonic microalga that is of potentially great importance in the field of biotechnology. Colonies held together by a lipid biofilm matrix can be found in temperate or tropical oligotrophic lakes and estuaries, and will bloom when in the presence of elevated levels of dissolved inorganic phosphorus. The species is notable for its ability to produce high amounts of hydrocarbons, especially oils in the form of Triterpenes, that are typically around 30–40% of their dry weight. Compared to other green alge species it has a relatively thick cell wall that is accumulated from previous cellular divisions; making extraction of cytoplasmic components rather difficult. Much of the useful hydrocarbon oil is outside of the cell.

Optimal growth environment
Botryococcus braunii has been shown to grow best at a temperature of 23 °C, a light intensity of 60 W/m2, with a light period of 12 hours per day, and a salinity of 0.15 molar NaCl. However, this was the results of testing with one strain, and others certainly vary to some degree. In the laboratory, B. braunii is commonly grown in cultures of Chu 13 medium   .

Toxic blooms and competition
Blooms of Botryococcus braunii have been shown to be toxic to other micro-organisms and fishes. The cause of the blooms and their subsequent damage to the populations of other organisms has been studied. The exudate of Botryococcus braunii in the form of free fatty acids has been identified as the cause. A higher alkalinity changes these free fatty acids into a form which is more toxic to other species, thus causing Botryococcus braunii to become more dominant. Higher alkalinity often occurs when ashes from burned areas are washed into a body of water. While the dominance of Botryococcus braunii can be seen as damaging to the environmental diversity of a body of water, the knowledge of how it gains and maintains dominance is useful to those who intend to grow ponds of it as a fuel crop.

Biofuel applications of Botryococcus oils

The practice of farming cultivating is known as algaculture. Botryococcus braunii has great potential for algaculture because of the hydrocarbons it produces, which can be chemically converted into fuels. Up to 86% of the dry weight of Botryococcus braunii can be long-chain hydrocarbons. The vast majority of these hydrocarbons are botryocuccus oils: botryococcenes, alkadienes and alkatrienes. Transesterification can NOT be used to make biodiesel from Botryococcus oils. This is because these oils are not vegetable oils in the common meaning, in which they are fatty acid triglycerides. While Botryococcus oils are oils of vegetable origin, they are inedible and chemically very different, being triterpenes, and lack the free oxygen atom needed for transesterification. Botryococcus oils can be used as feedstock for hydrocracking in an oil refinery to produce octane (gasoline, a.k.a. petrol), kerosene, and diesel. (see vegetable oil refining). Botryococcenes are preferred over alkadienes and alkatrienes for hydrocracking as botryococcenes will likely be transformed into a fuel with a higher octane rating.

Oils
Three major races of Botryococcus braunii are known, and they are distinguished by the structure of their oils. Botryococcenes are unbranched isoprenoid triterpenes having the formula CnH2n-10. The  A race produces alkadienes and alkatrienes (derivatives of fatty acids) wherein n is an odd number 23 through 31. The B race produces botryococcenes wherein n is in the range 30 through 37. Botryococcenes are the biofuels of choice for hydrocracking to gasoline-type hydrocarbons. The "L" strain makes an oil not formed by other strains of Botryococcus braunii.  Within this major classification, various strains of Botryococcus will differ in the precise structure and concentrations of the constituent hydrocarbons oils.

According to page 30 on Aquatic Species Program report, the A-strain of Botryococcus braunii did not function well as a feedstock for lipid-based fuel production due to its slow growth (one doubling every 72 hours). However, subsequent research by Qin showed that the doubling time could be reduced to 48 hours in its optimal growth environment. In view of findings by Frenz, the doubling times may not be as important as the method of hydrocarbon harvest. The Aquatic Species Program also found A-strain Botryococcus braunii oil to be less than ideal, having most of its lipids as C29 to C34 aliphatic hydrocarbons, and less abundance of C18 fatty acids. This evaluation of the oils of Botryococcus braunii was done in relation to their suitability for transesterification (i.e. creating biodiesel), which was the focus of the Aquatic Species Program at the time Botryococcus braunii was evaluated. The Aquatic Species Program did not study oils of Botryococcus braunii for their suitability in hydrocracking, as some subsequent studies have done on the "B" race.

Extraction of oils
Compared to other green algae species, Botryococcus braunii has a relatively thick cell wall that is accumulated from previous cellular divisions; making extraction of cytoplasmic components rather difficult. Much of the useful hydrocarbon oil is outside of the cell, acting as a biofilm to aggregate individual cells into colonies. The best method of separating the oils from the cells with minimal damage to the cells has long been sought. For some time, it has been known that hexane can perform this function. However, an electrical method may be cleaner and better overall. Electric fields have been applied in short pulses to extract hydrocarbons from other species of microalgae by weakening the cell walls. These pulses have been microseconds to milliseconds in length. In April 2017 it was reported researchers at Kumamoto University in Japan have used shorter, nanosecond long pulses to target the extracellular matrix of Botryococcus braunii. They found the electric method to be less costly and less damaging to the cells than other methods. The Kunamoto scientists found that when the pulses are applied ten times per second, the optimal field strength was 50 kilovolts per centimeter and the optimal energy applied to be 55.6 Joules per milliliter of Botryococcus braunii matrix. Polysaccharides are also extracted from the matrix and must be separated from the oils.

Research
Due to the burgeoning interest in alternatives to fossil fuels, research on Botryococcus braunii has increased. In April 2017, Dr. Tim Devarenne of Texas A&M University (TAMU) announced the DNA sequencing of the genome of Bb had been completed. A year earlier, in 2016, Dr. Devarenne's team at TAMU discovered the enzyme responsible for creating the Bb oil, known as lycopadiene. The enzyme is known as lycopadiene synthase, or LOS, is capable of making several types of oils. Devarenne suggested that the LOS gene might be might be implanted in other algae with faster metabolism, in order to speed up production of the oil.

Potentially useful strains
This heading is a collection of strains of note because of their potential utility. Some of these strains are patented as a result of active DNA modification, while, others are from traditional selection processes.

In 1988, UCBerkeley was granted US Plant Patent 6169 for Botryococcus braunii variety Showa, developed by UC Berkeley scientist Arthur Nonomura, in the Melvin Calvin Laboratory as part of the Nobel laureate's groundbreaking interdisciplinary program for the development of renewable transport fuels. The proprietary variety was notable, says the patent application, because of its highly reproducible botryococcenes hydrocarbon content comprising 20% of the dry weight of "Showa." It is clear that Showa was borne out as the top source of hydrocarbons of its time. The patent expired in April 2008.

In May 2006, Nonomura filed an international patent application disclosing novel growth and harvesting processes for the Chlorophyta. A separate patent for plants is also filed on Botryococcus braunii variety Ninsei that exhibits the feature of extracolonial secretion of it botryococcenoids that can be processed in existing gasoline refineries to transport fuels.

In August 2011, variety Enomoto was announced by IHI NeoG Algae LLC. It has "...the highest yield for this fuel production over all the algae that have been discovered in the world", with a claimed monthly growth a thousand times higher than normal strains Botryococcus braunii. It is additionally said to be very robust, presumably meaning it could be grown in an open environment (in ponds, instead of photobioreactors).

See also
Torbanite, a coal formed from Botryococcus braunii deposits

References

External links
 Frank Weigert's critical essay on The Energy Collective holds Botryococcus braunii out as one of the more promising renewable hydrocarbons
 images of Botryococcus braunii

High lipid content microalgae
Trebouxiales
Taxa named by Friedrich Traugott Kützing